St Aidan's Theological College, Ballarat was an Australian educational institution, started in 1903, to train clergy to serve in the Church of England in Australia (now the Anglican Church of Australia). Principals included Arthur Winnington-Ingram, later the Archdeacon of Hereford, and former students Brian Macdonald, an assistant bishop of Perth, Western Australia. It closed in 1932.

References

Anglican seminaries and theological colleges
Former theological colleges in Australia
Education in Ballarat
1903 establishments in Australia
Educational institutions established in 1903
Educational institutions disestablished in 1932